Unknown Country is an album by New Zealand group The Clean, released in 1996.

Critical reception
CMJ wrote that "it's incredibly easy to be struck by how peculiar this record is, and easier still to forget that The Clean has been doing inventive, experimental, and, well, strange things in its music all along."

Track listing

Charts

References

External links

1996 albums
The Clean albums
Flying Nun Records albums